Jem Paul Karacan (born 21 February 1989) is a former professional footballer who played as a midfielder. Karacan spent the majority of his career with Reading, whilst also playing for AFC Bournemouth, Millwall, Galatasaray, Bursaspor, Bolton Wanderers, Central Coast Mariners, Scunthorpe United and Radcliffe. Internationally He played for the Turkish youth team, and has captained the U-21 side.

Early life
Karacan was born in Catford, London to a Turkish father and an English mother. Between the ages of seven and fourteen he played for the now defunct Wimbledon and left after they relocated to Milton Keynes. He had been offered a four-year contract at the club his father supported, Galatasaray, but refused citing language difficulties, "I couldn't go out there at only 14, not speaking the language and so on". Karacan joined Reading's Youth Academy instead, having been spotted playing against the Royals while on trial at Manchester United.

Club career

Reading
On 6 July 2007, he signed a two-year professional contract with Reading, and made his debut against Luton Town on 26 August in the League Cup, getting on the scoresheet.

Loan to AFC Bournemouth and Millwall
Karacan joined AFC Bournemouth on loan, initially for one month, on 18 October 2007. Karacan was put into the starting XI for Bournemouth on 20 October away to Millwall, where he made his league debut in Bournemouth's 2–1 defeat. His loan was subsequently extended to 6 January 2008. Karacan signed a further loan deal in the 2007–08 season on 20 March 2008, this time to Football League One side Millwall, which was originally due to run until 19 April 2008, but was extended to the end of the 2007–08 season.

Return to Reading
He scored against Aston Villa in a pre season match before the 2008–09 season, and scored his first professional goal for Reading in a League Cup win over Luton Town on 26 August 2008. Towards the end of 2008, he began to start a few matches after impressing in the reserves and following injuries to James Harper and Marek Matejovsky. He signed a new 2 and half-year contract in October 2008, keeping him at the club until the end of the 2010–11 season. He scored his first league goal in Reading's 2–2 draw with Blackpool F.C. on 13 April 2009, in the Championship. On 20 August 2011, Karacan made his 100th appearance in all competitions for Reading against Barnsley in a 2–1 defeat. During Reading's 2–0 victory over Leeds United on 6 April, Karacan suffered a broken ankle after a tackle by Michael Brown. He signed a new contract on 19 September 2012 keeping him at the club until June 2015. On 4 May 2013 Karacan scored his first Premier League goal with a low shot into the bottom corner in Reading's 4–2 away win against Fulham.

He began the 2013–14 season in good goalscoring form, netting twice in a 3–3 draw against Watford on 17 August. A month later he again suffered a serious injury in a game against Leeds and had to be substituted after nine minutes. The club later confirmed that he had ruptured both his anterior cruciate and medial ligaments and would be out for six to nine months. After more than a year out, he entered the final part of his recovery in October 2014.

For the 2014–15 season, Karacan was made captain by Nigel Adkins and changed his squad number to 21, due to his admiration for Italian maestro Andrea Pirlo. He made a brief return from his injury nightmare on 10 January 2015, coming on as a late substitute against Middlesbrough,. He scored a consolation goal from 20 yards on 14 March, after replacing Jake Taylor as a second-half substitute in a 4–1 defeat at Vicarage Road, in his second appearance of the season.

He went on to play in each of the remaining games and made his final appearance in a Reading FC shirt in a 3–0 away victory against Derby County.

Galatasaray
On 8 July 2015, Karacan joined Galatasaray on a three-year contract following the expiration of his Reading contract at the end of the 2014–15 season.

Karacan made his debut for the club in a 1–0 victory against Bursaspor in the Super Cup final, replacing Lukas Podolski in the final 10 minutes of the game.

He made his Süper Lig debut against Gaziantepspor after replacing Yasin Öztekin, and Galatasaray won that match 2–1. Karacan played 90 minutes against Eskişehirspor where his team won 4–0, showing himself as a central midfielder both offensively and defensively.

Karacan made his Campions League debut on 25 November 2015 completing 90 minutes away to Atlético Madrid in a 2–0 defeat.

He scored his first goal for the club in a 4–0 win against Kastamonuspor in the Turkish Cup on 26 January 2016. This was his last appearance before leaving to join Bursaspor for the remainder of the season.

Karacan left Galatasaray by mutual consent on 6 January 2017.

Loan to Bursaspor
On 1 February 2016, Karacan was loaned to fellow Süper Lig club Bursaspor until the end of the 2015–16.

He played 10 games whilst on loan at Bursaspor playing mainly as a central midfielder but showing versatility by playing his final game for the club appearing as right back and getting man of the match in a 1–1 draw with Konyaspor.

Bursaspor enquired about the permanent signing of Karacan but according to reports the financial situation at the club meant negotiations broke down.

Bolton Wanderers
On 11 March 2017, Karacan joined Bolton Wanderers on a one-month contract, making his debut for the Trotters from the substitutes bench that same day, coming on for Darren Pratley in a 4–2 win away at Fleetwood Town. On the final day of the season, Karacan scored the opening goal to put Bolton 1-0 up against Peterborough United in a 3–0 win, which was enough to seal promotion back to Championship as runners up. On 24 May, the club confirmed that Karacan had signed a one-year deal, with an option for a further year, keeping him at the club until at least June 2018. Parkinson made Karacan captain for several games during the first third of the season and then due to unknown circumstances he was out of favour. On 23 May 2018, Karacan confirmed that the option on his contract was not activated and was leaving Bolton Wanderers at the end of his contract in June 2018. The day after, Bolton confirmed that Karacan would leave the club at the end of his contract.

Millwall
On 17 August 2018, Millwall announced the signing of Karacan on a short-term deal until January 2019. Karacan left Millwall at the end of his contract on 15 January 2019.

Central Coast Mariners
On 24 January 2019, Central Coast Mariners announced the signing of Karacan on a contract until the end of the 2018–19 season.

Scunthorpe United
Karacan joined League Two club Scunthorpe United on a short-term deal on 4 January 2021. At the end of the 2020–21 season, after helping Scunthorpe United avoid relegation and playing 24 times, Karacan left the club with the expiration of his contract. He was one of 17 players released by Scunthorpe at the end of the 2020–21 season.

Radcliffe
On 2 July 2022, Radcliffe announced the singing of Karacan.

Retirement
On 23 January 2023, Karacan announced his retirement from football.

International career
Born to a Turkish father and English mother, Karacan is eligible to represent both countries at international level. He chose to represent Turkey and has captained them at youth level. He made his debut for the under-21s as a substitute against Armenia in August 2008, before making his first appearance for the A2 team when they beat Estonia 5–0 in March 2012. Karacan received his first senior call-up for Turkey on 13 October 2012, for the 2014 FIFA World Cup qualification match against Hungary, but was an unused substitute.

Career statistics

Honours
Reading
EFL Championship: 2011–12

Galatasaray
Turkish Super Cup: 2015

References

External links

Jem Karacan profile at Reading F.C.
Jem Karacan profile at the Turkish Football Federation
 
 

1989 births
Living people
Footballers from Catford
English footballers
Turkish footballers
Turkey youth international footballers
Turkey under-21 international footballers
Turkey B international footballers
Association football midfielders
Reading F.C. players
AFC Bournemouth players
Millwall F.C. players
Galatasaray S.K. footballers
Bursaspor footballers
Bolton Wanderers F.C. players
Central Coast Mariners FC players
Scunthorpe United F.C. players
Radcliffe F.C. players
Premier League players
English Football League players
Süper Lig players
Sportspeople of Turkish Cypriot descent
English people of Turkish descent
English people of Turkish Cypriot descent
Turkish people of English descent
English expatriate footballers
Turkish expatriate footballers
Expatriate soccer players in Australia
English expatriate sportspeople in Australia
Turkish expatriate sportspeople in Australia